Mojib Latif (born 29 September 1954) is a German meteorologist and oceanographer of Pakistani descent.  Latif graduated with a Diplom in meteorology in 1983. He took a position as scientist at the Max Planck Institute for Meteorology in 1985. In 1987 he earned a Ph.D. in oceanography from the University of Hamburg. In 2003 he became professor at IFM-GEOMAR, Kiel, the Leibniz Institute of Marine Sciences. Mojib Latif is a regular guest at TV discussions about global warming.

Academic career
In 2008 Latif was joint author of a modelling study in Nature whose results suggested "global surface temperature may not increase over the next decade, as natural climate variations in the North Atlantic and tropical Pacific temporarily offset the projected anthropogenic warming."  At the UN's World Climate Conference 2009 in Geneva Latif gave a talk about prediction that used, amongst other material, results from this paper. New Scientist reported about Latif's research that "we could be about to enter one or even two decades of cooler temperatures".  This interpretation has been stated as incorrect in an interview with Latif, after being asked whether he was a global warming sceptic, he explained that "If my name was not Mojib Latif, my name would be global warming. So I really believe in Global Warming. Okay. However, you know, we have to accept that there are these natural fluctuations, and therefore, the temperature may not show additional warming temporarily." In 2000, he gave an interview to the German journal Der Spiegel where he said "Winter with strong frost and a lot of snow, as happened 20 years ago, will no longer exist in our region."

Selected publications

Personal life
Latif's father, Chaudhry Abdul Latif, migrated to Germany from Pakistan. He was an imam and one of the founders of Hamburg's Ahmadi-affiliated Fazle Omar Mosque in 1957. Latif is married to Norwegian-born Elisabeth Latif.

References

External links

1954 births
Living people
German meteorologists
German oceanographers
Pakistani meteorologists
Pakistani oceanographers
German people of Pakistani descent
University of Hamburg alumni
Naturalized citizens of Germany
Sverdrup Gold Medal Award Recipients